Karolína Muchová was the reigning champion, but chose not to participate. 

Zhu Lin won her first WTA 125 tournament, defeating Kristina Mladenovic in the final, 6–0, 6–4.

Seeds

Draw

Finals

Top half

Bottom half

References

External Links
Main Draw

Korea Open - Singles
2021 Singles